This is a list of monuments that are classified by the Moroccan ministry of culture around El Jadida.

Monuments and sites in El Jadida 

|}

References 

El Jadida
El Jadida Province